(Methyl-Co(III) tetramethylammonium-specific corrinoid protein):coenzyme M methyltransferase (methyltransferase 2, mtqA (gene)) is an enzyme with systematic name methylated tetramethylammonium-specific corrinoid protein:coenzyme M methyltransferase. This enzyme catalyses the following chemical reaction

 [methyl-Co(III) tetramethylammonium-specific corrinoid protein] + coenzyme M   methyl-CoM + [Co(I) tetramethylammonium-specific corrinoid protein]

This enzyme catalyses the transfer of a methyl group from a corrinoid protein.

References

External links 
 

EC 2.1.1